Olivancillaria urceus is a species of sea snail, a marine gastropod mollusk in the family Olividae, the olives.

Distribution
O. urceus is endemic to the South American coastline, from Brazil to Uruguay.

References

Olividae
Gastropods described in 1798